There are several different Hello Kitty animated series, featuring the character Hello Kitty, from the Japanese company Sanrio.

Hello Kitty's Furry Tale Theater (1987)
Hello Kitty's Furry Tale Theater is an American animated series produced by DIC Enterprises and animated by Toei Animation. The series involved Hello Kitty and her friends doing their own version of popular fairy tales and stories. Each of the 13 half-hour episodes consisted of two 11-minute cartoons, and they first aired on CBS from September 19 to December 12, 1987.

Hello Kitty and Friends (1989–1994)
Hello Kitty and Friends is a series of Japanese OVAs (and two Sanrio Anime Festival films) that were dubbed in English. The series featured Hello Kitty and other characters like Keroppi, Pochaco, and Pekkle. Episodes were also broadcast on ZDF and Super RTL (Germany) and Canal de las Estrellas (Mexico).

Episodes
Hello Kitty - Cinderella (22 July 1989)
Keroppi - The Big Adventure (27 September 1989)
Keroppi - Find the Pink Mushroom (1990)
Hello Kitty - The Sleeping Princess (20 July 1991)
Hello Kitty - The Circus Comes to Town (21 July 1992)
Hello Kitty - The Day the Big Clock Stopped (21 July 1992)
Keroppi - Let's Play Baseball (21 July 1992)
Hello Kitty - Mom Loves Me After All (21 August 1992)
Hello Kitty - The Magic Apple (21 September 1992)
Hello Kitty - Santa's Missing Hat (1 November 1992)
Keroppi - The Christmas Eve Gift - Santa and His Reindeer Kuppi (1 November 1992)
Pekkle - The Great Swimming Race (21 March 1993)
Pekkle - Find the Secret Treasure (21 April 1993)
Hello Kitty - The Wonderful Sisters (21 May 1993)
Keroppi - The Adventures of the Coward Prince (21 May 1993)
Hello Kitty - Snow White (21 July 1993)
Hello Kitty - Heidi (21 August 1993)
Keroppi - The Adventures of Gulliver (21 August 1993)
Pekkle - Aladdin and His Magic Lamp (21 September 1993)
Pochacco - Exciting Birthday (21 October 1993)
Pekkle - The Adventures of Sinbad (21 October 1993)
Hello Kitty - Alice in Wonderland (21 November 1993)
Keroppi - The Frog's Secret House (21 November 1993)
Pochacco - The Excitment at the Carrot Patch (21 November 1993)
Hello Kitty - The Dream Thief (21 December 1993)
Keroppi - Robin Hood (21 January 1994)
Hello Kitty - The Prince in his Dream Castle (12 February 1994)
Keroppi - Let's Be Friends (21 February 1994)
Keroppi - Our Treasure (21 March 1994)
Patty and Jimmy - You're a Superstar (21 March 1994)

Cast 
 Karen Bernstein - Hello Kitty
 Mary Long - Mimmy
 Jill Frappier - Keroppi
 Tracey Hoyt - Keroleen
 Jeff Lumby - Ganta/Junk
 Elva Mai Hoover - Noberun/Newton, Den Den
 Nadine Rabinovitch - Teru Teru/Ruby
 Julie Lemieux - Kyorosuke/Soak
 Susan Roman - Pekkle
 Paulina Gillis - Pochacco
 Addison Bell
 Tony Daniels
 Paul De La Rosa
 Elizabeth Hanna
 Jonathan Potts
 Ron Rubin
 John Stocker

Hello Kitty's Paradise (1999)
 is a children's variety series that officially ran from January 5, 1999 to March 29, 2011. The show was the longest running weekly children's program in TV Tokyo's history, and aired on Tuesday mornings at 7:30 AM JST throughout its 12-year run. Following the series finale, it was immediately replaced by Pretty Rhythm Aurora Dream in its timeslot on April 9, 2011.

Animated shorts were released on video with the Kitty's Paradise brand between March 25 and October 22, 1999. Saban Entertainment adapted these shorts into a TV series in the U.S. titled Hello Kitty's Paradise. This show ran on the Fox Family Channel from March 4 to September 16, 2000. ADV Films licensed the home video rights to this series and initially released it on VHS and DVD between November 26, 2002 and March 25, 2003.

Episodes
Episodes from Pretty Kitty
A Blooming Good Morning (あさがおさいた)
A Storybook Adventure (おはなしをつくろう)
Kitty's Clean Cuisine (ごはんはたのしく！)
A Day Out with Dad (おみせやさんなにやさん？)
Underground Kitty (つちのなかはどうなってるの)
Watch the Birdie (キティとミミィとことりさん)
Minding Manners (フォークどうする？)
Streetwise (まちへおでかけ)
Episodes from Fun With Friends
The Magic Bags (ふしぎなふくろ)
The Dust Monster (ほこりオバケがでてきたぞ)
Put On a Happy Place (かざってみよう)
The Train to Grandma's House (でんしゃでおでかけ)
Paper Play (かみでつくろう)
Sizing Things Up (ちょっとといっぱい)
The Broken Robot (こわれたロボット)
What's in Store (これっていくつ？)
Episodes from Share And Care
Shadow Play (かげであそぼう)
Happy Birthday Papa (パパにおてがみ)
The Great Kitty Car Race (つみきののりもの)
Adventures in Groceryland (おつかいできる？)
A Trip to Rainbow Park (なにいろがいいかな)
Birthday Party Time (おたんじょうびにおよばれ)
Making Cookies (クッキーをつくろう)
Great Shapes! (いろんなかたち)
Episodes from Learn With love
A Stitch in Time Saves Nine Lives! (とけいのなかは・・・)
The Big and Small of It (おおきい？ちいさい？)
A Puzzling Day (かたちであそぼ)
A Fair Share (はんぶんこしよう)
Can You Count Them? (かぞえられる？)
Everything Has Its Place (あそんだあとはもとのばしょ)
Once Upon A Kitty (キティとミミィのえほん)
A Nice Little Walk in the City (どうろのルール)

Cast 
 Melissa Fahn - Hello Kitty
 Laura Summer - Mimmy
 Jennifer Darling - Mama
 Tony Pope - Papa
 Barbara Goodson - Moley
 Sally/Birdie
 Hally/Flirdie
 Sandy Fox - Tracey 
 Cate Blanchett - Cathy
 Kristen Schaal - Fifi

Growing Up With Hello Kitty (2001)
 is a series of OVAs by Sanrio featuring Hello Kitty and her twin sister Mimmy as they learn life lessons. The first 16-episode series was released on video between August 21, 1994 and October 21, 1998, while the second 16-episode series was released on video between March 1 and March 17, 2001. AnimEigo released the second series on DVD in 2012 in North America as Growing Up With Hello Kitty, with an English dub by Coastal Studios. Each disc contains six episodes focusing on issues such as learning how to talk on the phone, cleaning up a messy room and playing nicely. The production has been generally well-reviewed, with viewers pleased by both the quality of the production as well as the educational content.

Segments
Going to The Bathroom (トイレにいけるよ)
Changing Our Clothes (ひとりできがえ)
Eating Nicely (きちんとしょくじ)
I Can Share With Friends (がまんできるよ)
Sleeping By Ourselves (ひとりでおやすみ)
Saying I'm Sorry (ごめんねいえる)
Cleaning Up My Mess (おかたづけできる)
Replying Properly (きちんとおへんじ)
Talking On the Phone (でんわでおはなし)
Let's Play Together (なかよくあそぼう)
It's Fun to Help (たのしいおてつだい)
Eating Our Vegetables (なんでもたべよう)
Undubbed
Traffic Safety (こうつうあんぜん)
Let's Brush (はみがきしようね)
Energetic Greeting (げんきにあいさつ)
I Like Bathing (だいすきおふろ)

Hello Kitty's Animation Theater (2001)
 is a 26-episode anime series produced by Sanrio and animated by Group TAC. Its 12-minute episodes aired on TV from April 3 to December 25, 2001 and they were released on home video from July to December 2001. It was licensed by ADV Films and released on home video as Hello Kitty's Animation Theater between February 1 and July 12, 2005.

Hello Kitty's Stump Village (2005)
Hello Kitty's Stump Village is a Japanese/South Korean clay-animated series produced in 2005 by Sanrio, SOVIK Venture Capital and Studio Tomorrow. It was acquired for North American distribution by Geneon and released on DVD with an English dub by Bang Zoom! Entertainment between October 31, 2006, and September 4, 2007. In Japan, the series was released on DVD on April 25, 2007 by Tohokushinsha Film. It later premiered on Cartoon Network in the country on May 3, 2008. In South Korea, the series debuted on Champ on October 1, 2007.

Unlike other series, there is no dialogue in this one. Instead, the narrator tells the events of the episodes.

Episodes
 Seesaw Nutcracker
 Veggie Sunglasses
 Goodie Town
 Heart Shaped Fruit
 Friends Again
 Strange Penguin
 Shadow Show
 Hoop-a-Doop
 Domino Game
 Please Come Back
 Air Balloon
 Little Twin Stars
 Kiwi Cars
 Magical Bowling
 Grape Juice
 Mask Party
 Don't Be Picky
 Candy Tree
 Stump Theater
 Circus
 Puppet Show
 Scarecrow
 Wheat Field
 Windmill
 Trick or Treat
 Keroppi the Frog

Hello Kitty: Ringo no Mori (2006-2008) 
Hello Kitty: Ringo no Mori was an anime series divided into three seasons. The seasons are: Hello Kitty: Ringo no Mori no Fantasy (ハローキティ りんごの森のファンタジー), Hello Kitty: Ringo no Mori no Mystery ( ハローキティ りんごの森のミステリー) and Hello Kitty: Ringo no Mori to Parallel Town (ハローキティ りんごの森とパラレルタウン). The anime was a production of Asahi Production.

While this series was never released in English, it did receive several dubs in Spanish, Italian, French, Portuguese, Chinese and Arabic.

The Adventures of Hello Kitty & Friends (2008-2009)
The Adventures of Hello Kitty & Friends is a 3D CGI animated series from 2008 developed by Sanrio's digital entertainment entity Sanrio Digital and Dream Cortex. It premiered on TVB Jade.

The World of Hello Kitty (2016-2019)
The World of Hello Kitty is a flash animated webseries of shorts produced by Sanrio and the Brazilian animation studio Plot Kids. It started streaming on the Latin American Hello Kitty YouTube channels in 2016 and ended in 2019, lasting 4 seasons with 76 episodes and 19 video clips. The last season was themed to honor the character's 45th birthday. An English dubbed version began streaming on the Southeast Asian Hello Kitty YouTube channels in April 2020.

This animation has appearances of other Sanrio characters such as Keroppi, Badtz-Maru and Chococat (introduced in the second season), and also My Melody and Little Twin Stars (appearing only in the final season). In 2020 a special season with 6 episodes entitled Hello Kitty & Amigos: Chef Star was released.

Hello Kitty & Friends - Let's Learn Together (2017)
 is a series of animated educational webshorts by Sanrio that began streaming in Japan on Hikari TV Channel on July 28, 2017. A total of 21 seven-minute episodes were produced. The show was later released on DVD in Japan by Nippon Columbia.

On July 25, 2018, Sentai Filmworks acquired the rights to release the series in the United States, Canada, United Kingdom, Australia, and New Zealand. An English dubbed version was then released on DVD in November 2018.

Hello Kitty Channel (2018)
In August 2018, Sanrio began streaming a CGI animated series on YouTube. It features Hello Kitty talking to the camera about her life in the style of vlogging YouTubers.

Gundam vs Hello Kitty (2019)
In January 2019 a limited Original net animation series in three episodes entitled  was launched featuring a crossover between Hello Kitty with the classic 1979 anime series Mobile Suit Gundam. The animation was part of a cross-promotion to commemorate the 40th anniversary of Gundam and the 45th anniversary of Hello Kitty. The episodes were made available on its own YouTube channel with animation made by Sunrise.

Hello Kitty Fun (2019-2021)
Hello Kitty Fun is another flash animated web series of shorts also exclusive from Hello Kitty's Latin YouTube Channels. The series was created as a replacement for The World of Hello Kitty, however different from the previous one this series uses a hand-drawn art style, and it has no dialogue. No other character (besides Hello Kitty) appears in this series. The series is a production made between Sanrio and the Brazilian animation studio Split Studio.

On the English channel the series is presented under the name Sweet Moments with Hello Kitty.

Hello Kitty and Friends Supercute Adventures (2020-present) 
The latest addition to the franchise Hello Kitty and Friends Supercute Adventures is an animated web series published weekly to the official Hello Kitty and Friends YouTube. The first episode aired on Monday, October 26 at 3pm PST with an all star cast of Hello Kitty, Keroppi, Badtz-Maru, My Melody, Pompompurin, and Kuromi. In season 2, Chococat and Cinnamoroll joined the main cast, while in season 4, Pochacco joined the cast.

Hello Kitty: Super Style! (2022-2023) 
Hello Kitty: Super Style! is a 3D animation series which began streaming on Amazon Kids+ in December 2022. The series is 52 episodes and a French and Italian co-production, with Carly Rae Jepsen singing the theme song.

References

External links

 

Hello Kitty
Hello Kitty
ADV Films
Funimation
TV Tokyo original programming
Hello Kitty
Hello Kitty